Uuriintuya Dagvasambuu (Mongolian: Дагвасамбуугийн Үүрийнтуяа) is a Mongolian artist. As a "contemporary master of Mongol Zurag", she incorporates traditional patterns and Buddhist motifs in her paintings and draws on experiences of Mongolian women and the everyday lives of post-nomadic Mongolia.

Early life and career 
Dagvasambuu was born in 1979 in Ulaanbaatar, Mongolia. She received her bachelor's degree in 2002 from Mongolian University of Arts and Culture. Later in 2004, she graduated from the Mongolian State University of Education with a master's degree.

Dagvasambuu has exhibited extensively at international exhibitions such as Asia Pacific Triennial and Fukuoka Asian Art Triennale. She was part of the 2017 documenta 14 tour organized by Goethe Institute Mongolia in partnership with Mongolian Contemporary Art Support Association.

Dagvasambuu is married to a Mongolian artist and curator Batzorig Mart. In 2019, they had a joint exhibition exploring the extent of each other's influence on one another's work. Titled Assimilation Non-Assimilation, the exhibition was held at Art Space 976+, Ulaanbaatar, Mongolia.

Notable exhibitions

Solo exhibitions 
2018     ХАДГАЛАГДАХ, Art Space 976+, Ulaanbaatar, Mongolia

Selected group exhibitions 
2020     NADA Fair, Texas, USA

2020     Dallas Art Fair, Dallas, USA

2019     Assimilation Non-Assimilation, at Art Space 976+, Ulaanbaatar, Mongolia

2019     The Art of Everyday, Sapar Contemporary, NY, USA

2016     The Garden of Winter Light  (a space to linger), at Hanart TZ, Hong Kong

2015     8th Asia Pacific Triennial, Queensland, Australia

2014     5th Fukuoka Asian Art Triennale, Fukuoka, Japan

2014     Contemporary Art of Mongolia II, at Art Space 976+, Ulaanbaatar, Mongolia

2013     Women in Between: Asian Women Artists 1984 -2012, Tochigi Prefectural Museum of Fine Arts, Japan

2012     Women in Between: Asian Women Artists 1984-2012, at Fukuoka Asian Art Museum, Japan

2012     9th Shanghai Biennale, Shanghai, China

2012     Arsenal 2012 Kyiv Biennial, Ukraine

2011     Between Heaven and Earth: Contemporary Art from the Centre of Asia, at Calvert 22, London, UK

2010     From Imagination to Creation, National Modern Art Gallery, Ulaanbaatar, Mongolia

2010     Smoke in the Brain, Red Ger Art Gallery, Ulaanbaatar, Mongolia

2010     Modern Mongolia, Han Art Gallery, Hong Kong

2008     3rd Beijing Biennale, Beijing, China

2006     Art Expo, Las Vegas, USA

Selected awards 
Uuriintuya is a recipient of several prestigious awards including 2012 Grand Prix for Best Art from Association of Mongol Zurag, 2013 Grand Prix for Best Artworks of the Year from National Modern Art Gallery of Mongolia as well as 2018 Grand Prix for Best Artwork of the Year from Union of Mongolian Artists.

References

External links 

 
  

Living people
1979 births
Mongolian artists
People from Ulaanbaatar